The 2009 Copa do Brasil de Futebol Feminino was the third staging of the competition. The competition started on September 24, 2009, and concluded on December 5, 2009. 32 clubs of all regions of Brazil participated of the cup, which is organized by the Brazilian Football Confederation (CBF). The winner of the cup represented Brazil in the 2010 Copa Libertadores de Fútbol Femenino.

Competition format
The competition was contested by 32 clubs in a knock-out format where in the first three rounds was played over two legs and the away goals rule was used, but if the away team won the first leg with an advantage of at least three goals, the second leg would not be played and the club automatically qualified to the next round. The fourth round was played in one leg. The final and the third-place game was played in one leg in a neutral venue.

Participating teams
The 2009 participating teams were the following clubs:

Table

Semifinals

Third-place playoff

Final

Notes and references

2009
2009 domestic association football cups
2009 Brazilian football competitions
Copa